Sachidanandan Puzhankara (Malayalam: സച്ചിദാനന്ദൻ പുഴങ്കര) is an Indian lyricist, poet, and screenwriter who works predominantly in Malayalam. He entered into the  Malayalam film industry in 1998 by writing the song 'Varamanjaladiya' for the film 'Pranayavarnangal' which was directed by Sibi Malayil. and music was composed by Vidyasagar and rest of the songs are written by Girish Puthenchery. The screenplay of the film  Pranayavarnangal was also written by him.  Since then, he has written many successful songs

Life and career 
Sachidanandan is born in Chalakudi village in Thrissur district of Kerala. He studied in maharajas college ernakulam and Government Victoria College, Palakkad. He worked as an officer in KSRTC. He entered the film industry through his friend Jayaraman Kadambat. His first film was Pranayavarnangal which was directed by  Sibi Malayil and music is composed by Vidyasagar. In the movie Pranayavarnangal he got an opportunity for writing a poetic song named "varamajaladiya Ravinte Maaril". and the song become iconic.

Filmography

Literary contributions 
  Pachavellam (Poetry collection)
Ivale vayikkumpol (Poetry collection)
Adukkala (Poetry collection)
Pacha (Poetry collection)
Vattiyilla (Poetry collection)
Ormmakkurippukal (Malayalam translation of Pablo Neruda's poems)
Vazhikatti (Malayalam translation of R.K. Narayanan's novel)
Anuranjanam (Malayalam translation of Benazir Bhutto's memoir)

References 

Malayalam-language lyricists
Living people
Year of birth missing (living people)
Poets from Kerala